The Leece Museum is a museum in Peel, Isle of Man established in 1984. It is dedicated to the local history of Peel.

External links 
 Leece Museum

References 

Museums in the Isle of Man